Yanic Jacques Perreault (born April 4, 1971) is a Canadian former professional ice hockey player who played thirteen seasons in the National Hockey League.

Playing career
As a youth, he played in the 1983 and 1984 Quebec International Pee-Wee Hockey Tournaments with a minor ice hockey team from Sherbrooke, Quebec.

Perreault started his hockey career for the Trois-Rivières Draveurs where he was one of the best offensive players in the Quebec Major Junior Hockey League, racking up a total of 185 points in his most productive season. He was drafted in the third round, 47th overall by the Toronto Maple Leafs in the 1991 NHL Entry Draft.

Carrying a reputation as too slow a skater to succeed in the NHL, Perreault played three years for the St. John's Maple Leafs, Toronto's American Hockey League affiliate.  Perreault led the St. John's Maple Leafs to a seventh game in the Calder Cup finals in the 1992 season and to first-place finishes the following two seasons; his 132 goals and 276 points became in that span, and remain, career records for the Leafs' American Hockey League franchise.

Perreault made his NHL debut in that third season with the Leafs, showing some flash in spot duty, before being traded to the Los Angeles Kings for a fourth round pick in 1994.  He spent most of that season with the Kings' minor league affiliate, the Phoenix Roadrunners, scoring 51 goals to lead the team.

The following year was his breakout season, making the NHL for good with the Kings, where he became the team's lead centre after Wayne Gretzky was traded late in the year amidst a full-scale reorganization of the team; Perreault scored 25 goals to finish second on the squad.  He played three more seasons in Los Angeles before being sent back to Toronto in 1999, for Jason Podollan and a third round selection.  In 2001, Perreault signed with the Montreal Canadiens as a free agent, remaining three seasons before sitting out the lockout year of 2005, after which he signed with the Nashville Predators, with whom he scored 57 points, his NHL career high.

He signed after that single season with the Phoenix Coyotes and was selected to play in the 2007 NHL All-Star Game.  On February 27, 2007, Perreault, packaged with a fifth round draft pick, was traded from the Coyotes to Toronto for defencemen Brendan Bell and a second round draft pick, marking his third round of duty with the Maple Leafs.

Perreault signed with the Chicago Blackhawks as a free agent on July 1, 2007.  However, with his scoring skills diminishing, he retired at the end of the 2007-08 season.

Perreault is often considered one of the best faceoff men in NHL history.

Coaching career
On October 4, 2013 − one day ahead of the second game of the season - the Blackhawks announced they had hired Perreault to help the team improve its face-off success rate. Perreault is also head coach for the Chicago Mission 2005 youth team.

Honors and awards
1989 QMJHL - Michel Bergeron Trophy (Offensive Rookie of the Year)
1989 Canadian Major Junior - Rookie of the Year
1991 QMJHL - First All-Star Team
1991 QMJHL - Frank J. Selke Memorial Trophy (Most Gentlemanly Player)
1991 QMJHL - Jean Beliveau Trophy (Leading scorer)
1991 QMJHL - Michel Briere Trophy (Most Valuable Player)
2007 NHL - Played in NHL All-Star Game

Career statistics

Regular season and playoffs

International

References

External links

1971 births
Living people
Canadian ice hockey centres
Chicago Blackhawks coaches
Chicago Blackhawks players
Ice hockey people from Quebec
Los Angeles Kings players
Montreal Canadiens players
Nashville Predators players
National Hockey League All-Stars
Phoenix Coyotes players
Phoenix Roadrunners (IHL) players
St. John's Maple Leafs players
Sportspeople from Sherbrooke
Toronto Maple Leafs draft picks
Toronto Maple Leafs players
Trois-Rivières Draveurs players
Canadian ice hockey coaches